is a subway station on the Hakozaki Line and Kūkō Line located in Hakata-ku, Fukuoka in Japan. The station's symbole mark is Chinese characters "" and "" look like Happi's motif.

Lines

Platforms 

 Some trains on the Hakozaki Line coming from Kaizuka stop at this station and continue on the Kūkō Line to Nishijin or Meinohama.
 Some trains on the Kūkō Line coming from Meinohama stop at this station and continue on the Hakozaki Line to Kaizuka.

Vicinity
Red light district
Nakasu Area
Canal City Hakata
Hakata Riverain
Fukuoka Asian Art Museum
Hakata-za Theater
Naka and Hakata River
Reisen Park
Don Quijote (store)

History
April 20, 1982: Subway line extended from Tenjin Station.
March 22, 1983: Line 1 (now Kūkō Line) to Hakata Station opened.

References

Railway stations in Fukuoka Prefecture
Railway stations in Japan opened in 1982
Kūkō Line (Fukuoka City Subway)
Hakozaki Line
Railway stations in Fukuoka, Fukuoka